Llan-ar-goll-en is a Welsh live action/animated children's television show created by Siwan Jobbins for S4C, and produced by Twt Productions and Cwmni Da. The show follows the adventures of two detectives; human Prys ar Frys and Ceri the Dog-tective, who manage to solve many mysteries in the titular village. It ran for 2 series with 51 episodes (including a half-hour Christmas special) from 23 December 2013 to 14 March 2016.

The show was filmed in Portmeirion, Wales, and notably features animated animal characters (such as one of the main characters, Ceri) interacting with a live action environment. The animation was done by Cloth Cat Animation using Flash animation. The title of the show is a pun on the Welsh town of Llangollen, and the Welsh term for lost, "ar goll".

Plot
In the small, crazy village of Llan-ar-goll-en, Wales, things are known to go missing all the time. Luckily for its citizens in dire need, two detectives that are very different from each other; Prys ar Frys the human, and his animated dog sidekick, Ceri, are known for solving mysteries and finding lost things. Whenever there's trouble, a siren is sounded and Prys and Ceri are immediately on the case.

Characters

Humans
 Prys ar Frys (played by Rhys ap Trefor) is a detective, and Ceri's human friend. He is always in a rush as he tends to jump to conclusions. He loves food, especially chips.
 Radli Migins (played by Dyfrig Evans) is a postman with a magic, flying bike named Elsi. He often crashes his bike. This character was interviewed in the Welsh Cyw series "Helo Shwmae" on 23 April 2021.
 Barti Felyn (played by Rhodri Sion) is a mischievous, unintelligible pirate who lives on a boat. His cat is Ianto.
 Dr. Jim Clem (played by Hefin Wyn) is an old man and an inventor.
 Arwel Achub (played by Gwydion Rhys) is a man with a green hat who performs many jobs in the village.
 Mrs. Tomos Ty Twt (played by Eiry Thomas) is a sweet, old and adventurous grandma.
 Tara Tan Toc (played by Catrin Mara) is a woman with pink hair who runs a beauty salon. She has a crush on Prys, and his feelings towards her have been shown to be mutual.
 Beti Becws (played by Siw Hughes) is a baker.
 AbracaDebra (played by Carys John) is a magician.
 Mia Pia (played by Miriam Isaac) likes animals, but they don't like her.

Animals
 Ceri the Dog-tective (voiced by Siwan Bowen Davies) is Prys' dog friend. She's more sensible and thinks things through. Her cousin is Caradog.
 Ianto is Barti's yellow pirate-cat who sometimes translates what his unintelligible owner is saying.
 Sugar Lump is Mrs. Tomos' red cat. Unlike Ceri and Ianto, he doesn't talk, but rather makes cat noises.

Production
Llan-ar-goll-en was conceived by Siwan Jobbins and is a co-production between Twt Productions and Cwmni Da, with animation services provided by Cloth Cat Animation using Flash animation. The show utilizes both live action and animation, the latter of which was implemented for animal characters like Ceri the Dog-tective and her cousin Caradog, Ianto, and Sugar Lumps. The show was shot in the coastal village of Portmeirion, Wales.

The main title was composed by Dyfan Jones and performed by Rhydian Bowen Phillips, with the choir performed by the students of Ysgol Gynradd Gymraeg Santes Tudful.

Episodes
All 51 episodes aired on S4C's "Cyw" block in Welsh with English subtitles made available. The first series aired from 23 December 2013 to 17 November 2014 with 26 episodes.

A Christmas special, and the start of the second series, aired on 24 December 2014, and the first half of the series started regularly airing from 2 March to 18 May 2015. Another Christmas special aired on 24 December 2015, and the rest of the series continued from 4 January to 14 March 2016 with 25 episodes.

Series 1 (2013–14)

Series 2 (2014–16)

Accolades
In 2015, Llan-ar-goll-en was nominated in the British Academy Cymru Awards for Children's Programme. It was beaten by #Fi (Boom Plant, S4C).

Merchandise
Interactive apps and e-books were created for Llan-ar-goll-en by Cloth Cat's sister company, Thud Media. They were made available on the iTunes Appstore and Google Play.

References

External links

 Llan-ar-goll-en on S4C
 PRIX JEUNESSE Catalogue 2013/2014, catalogue No. 307 on page 166

2010s Welsh television series
Animated television series about dogs
Fictional dogs
Television duos
S4C original programming
Welsh-language television shows
British flash animated television series